Nathan John Craig Pellowe (born 30 October 1978 Truro, Cornwall ) is a former British international gymnast who was the 2000 Men's English Champion. However, he was forced to retire in 2003 due to a persistent shoulder injury.

Gymnastic career
He showed an interest in gymnastics at the age of six and later joined the city of truro gymnastics clubs where he became Cornwall champion and then the South West champion. He then had stints at more developed academies based in Exeter and Bristol and finally landed a place at the Centre of Excellence at Lilleshall where he continued to excel, gaining National recognition and he representing his country on a number of occasions.

Injury deprived him of a chance to compete in the 2002 Commonwealth Games in which he was rated highly for the Pommel Horse. This injury proved to be damaging to Pellowe's career and eventually forced him to retire in early 2003.

Personal life

He is married to fellow former international gymnast Annika Reeder. The couple have 2 children, a boy, Oscar (born 2009) who died from a stroke in summer 2019 and was planted a tree in his name at his primary school, and a girl, Aurelia (born 2011).

References

1978 births
Living people
British male artistic gymnasts
People from Camborne
Sportspeople from Truro